Tata Business Support Services Ltd (Tata BSS) is a wholly owned subsidiary of Tata Sons, providing outsourced contact center services to large telecommunications operators, Internet service providers, DTH service providers, and online travel agencies amongst other domestic (Indian) and international clients. Tata BSS is among the third-party outsourced customer service providers in India, serving domestic as well as international customers. With facilities across 21 "global delivery centers" that accommodate more than 23,000 employees.

Tata BSS provides inbound and outbound services (voice and non-voice) in English (for US and Indian geographies) and 14 regional Indian languages from its Indian centers. The centers in the US offer inbound customer care services, email support, cross-selling and up-selling services to industries including e-commerce, healthcare & travel.

History

Tata Business Support Services was founded in 2004 as a wholly owned subsidiary of Tata Sons, the holding company of the Tata Group.

Operations

On 31 March 2014, Tata BSS had 45+ clients across the globe. Over 85% of its workforce is into sales and customer service. 
Locations: Tata BSS has global presence with offices and 21 development centers in India, US and Europe.

Tata BSS manages its operations in a hub & spoke model, distributed throughout India. Over 1.2 million customers connect every day. In recent years, the company has begun shifting part of its operations from the core hub in Hyderabad to its secondary hub in Pune, India.

In November 2017, Business services provider Quess Corp acquired Tata Business Support Services (TBSS) for Rs.153 crore . It will own 51% of the Hyderabad-headquartered company, with Tata Sons holding the remaining stake.

Products & Services

Tata BSS provides customer retention, acquisition and administration services, digital marketing, analytics, research and HR/payroll services to companies which are keen on increasing their customer base, retain high value customers and protect their brand reputation.

One of its known products is Genesys, a proprietary integrated insurance platform which combines CRM and policy management for third party auto-insurance.

Service lines include billing inquiry support, customer service, customer retention, customer experience management, customer life cycle management, data services, lead generation, product help desk, technical support and order management and new-age channels of digital marketing and analytics. Major industries served are Telecom, utilities, hospitality, media, entertainment, travel, retail, healthcare and manufacturing.

Initiatives

Affirmative Action & Impact Sourcing
Tata BSS is an avid supporter of Affirmative Action and hence employs huge number of SC/ST community people in their operations thereby making a huge impact on the society. 17% of total employees belong to this community. Tata BSS also employs large number of women and underprivileged people in their rural centres thus making a huge impact on the societal development. Employment and employability are the key focus areas for societal well-being. The organisation has recently won Mother Teresa Award for their CSR practices. With 8 rural centers, Tata BSS employs almost 1/3rd of the total rural BPM workforce of India.

Sambhavana
Tata BSS’  Free Employability Training Program has trained 7,570 people, who are absorbed by Tata BSS and other companies.

Learn while you Earn
Tata BSS targets specific villages with higher proportion of SC/ST (AA) candidates and hires from colleges/ campus BPO and takes them up on rolls – with an aim to provide earning opportunity to students who have additional burden of supporting their families.  Also Tata BSS works with NGOs and Govt. agencies for hiring from differently abled sections of the society.

Dedicated CSR Committee
2% of the net profits of the organization annually is allocated for CSR in the proportion of 60:40 wherein 60% of the budget is spent on up-skilling the contract staff & 40% is spent on providing immediate relief to the disadvantaged sections of the society. The dedicated CSR committee ensures agility in responding to natural calamities and incidents. Participation in Uttarakhand flood relief, Tata Engage volunteering week, AA vendor data tracked and AA dashboards and moving to rural locations with higher AA population are some of the key focus areas of community support.

Employees

Tata Business Support Services had more than 23,000 employees as of 31 August 2015, of which 33% were women. Tata BSS received Affirmative Action award from the TATA group and its workforce consists of over 17% employees representing the under-privileged classes of the society. Over 85% of its workforce is into providing services in sales and customer service.

The overall attrition rate is amongst the lowest in the BPO industry standing at 8% per month for 12 months ending 31 March 2014.

During FY 2013-14, Tata BSS received approximate 40,000 applications from prospective employees and had a gross addition of 9,600 employees.

List of CEOs
Mr. Munjuluri Nagabhushana Rao served as the MD & CEO from September 2005 till November 2012. In the interim periods, COOs served as the Managing Director in charge. In February 2014, Mr. Srinivas Koppolu took over as the Managing Director & CEO of the company.

External links

References

Tata Group
Companies based in Hyderabad, India
Business services companies established in 2004
2004 establishments in Andhra Pradesh
Indian companies established in 2004